Austria is a federal republic and a landlocked country of over 8.7 million people  in Central Europe. It is bordered by the Czech Republic and Germany to the north, Hungary and Slovakia to the east, Slovenia and Italy to the south, and Switzerland and Liechtenstein to the west.

Austria is the 12th richest country in the world in terms of GDP (Gross domestic product) per capita, has a well-developed social market economy, and a high standard of living. Until the 1980s, many of Austria's largest industry firms were nationalised; in recent years, however, privatisation has reduced state holdings to a level comparable to other European economies. Labour movements are particularly strong in Austria and have large influence on labour politics. Next to a highly developed industry, international tourism is the most important part of the national economy.

For further information on the types of business entities in this country and their abbreviations, see "Business entities in Austria".

Notable firms 
This list includes notable companies with primary headquarters located in the country. The industry and sector follow the Industry Classification Benchmark taxonomy. Organizations which have ceased operations are included and noted as defunct.

See also 
List of largest Austrian companies

References 

Austria